McLeod High School is a public high school located in the unincorporated community of McLeod, Texas and classified as a 2A school by the UIL. It is a part of the McLeod Independent School District located in southeastern Cass County. In 2015, the school was rated "Met Standard" by the Texas Education Agency.

Athletics
The McLeod Longhorns compete in these sports - 

Baseball
Basketball
Cross Country
Golf
Softball
Tennis
Track and Field

References

External links
McLeod ISD website

Public high schools in Texas
Schools in Cass County, Texas
Public middle schools in Texas